was a Japanese politician of the Democratic Party of Japan, a member of the House of Representatives in the Diet (national legislature).

A native of Fukui, Sasaki attended Waseda University as both undergraduate and graduate. He was elected to the House of Representatives for the first time in 1993 as an independent after running unsuccessfully in 1990.

References

External links 
  in Japanese.

1956 births
2022 deaths
People from Fukui (city)
Politicians from Fukui Prefecture
Waseda University alumni
Members of the House of Representatives (Japan)
Democratic Party of Japan politicians
21st-century Japanese politicians